

Seeds
The top four seeds receive a bye into the second round.

Draw

Finals

Top half

Bottom half

External links
Main Draw and Qualifying Draw

Mutua Women's Doubles
Women's Doubles